Khurshid Nabiev (born 11 August 1985) is an Uzbekistani judoka, who played for the middleweight category. He won a gold medal for his division at the 2007 Summer Universiade in Bangkok, Thailand, and silver at the 2008 Asian Judo Championships in Jeju City, South Korea.

Nabiev represented Uzbekistan at the 2008 Summer Olympics in Beijing, where he competed for the men's middleweight class (90 kg). He defeated Great Britain's Winston Gordon in the first preliminary round, before losing out his next match, with a waza-ari and a sumi gaeshi (corner throw), to Azerbaijan's Elkhan Mammadov.

References

External links
 
 

 NBC 2008 Olympics profile

Uzbekistani male judoka
Living people
Olympic judoka of Uzbekistan
Judoka at the 2008 Summer Olympics
1985 births
Universiade medalists in judo
Universiade gold medalists for Uzbekistan
Medalists at the 2007 Summer Universiade
20th-century Uzbekistani people
21st-century Uzbekistani people